Harsi Pind is a village Hoshiarpur district in the Indian state of Punjab.It is situated on Tanda-Gardhiwal link road ,adjoining to villages Rajput gahot (north),Jaja(south), Nangal khunga(east)Tanda urmar (west). The current sarpanch is Surinder Kaur & is serving her first term till Dec 2023

Demographics 
As of 2019 India   Harsi Pind  had a population of 2100. Males constitute  50.72% of the population and females 49.28%. Harsi Pind  has an average literacy rate of 69%, higher than the national average of 59.5%: male literacy is 74%, and female literacy is 63%. Majority of people belong to Saini cast

Transportation 
The nearest railway stations are Tanda Urmar (5 km),  Dasuya Junction (16 km). The closest airport, the Sri Guru Ram Dass Jee International Airport, Amritsar is 3 hours away.

References 

Cities and towns in Hoshiarpur district